The H.K.E Society's S.L.N College of Engineering in Raichur, Karnataka was founded in 1979. It is affiliated with Visvesvaraya Technological University, Belgaum, the university to which all engineering colleges in Karnataka are affiliated. From 2007,

History
SLNCE was established  by the Hyderabad Karnataka Education Society. It owes its name to SAROJINI LEELADHARAN NAIR.  It offers 6 graduate programs besides research programs in two disciplines. It is affiliated to Visvesvaraya Technological University, Belgaum and its undergraduate programs are accredited by the National Board of Accreditation (NBA) of the All India Council for Technical Education (AICTE).

Campus

Education programs

Graduate programs
 Mechanical Engineering (1979)
 Civil Engineering (1979)
 Computer Science and Engineering
 Electronics and Communication Engineering
 Information Science and Engineering
 Textile Technology

Postgraduate Program (M.B.A.)
 Master of Business Administration 2011

See also 

 Government Engineering College Raichur

References

Engineering colleges in Karnataka
Affiliates of Visvesvaraya Technological University
Education in Raichur
Universities and colleges in Raichur district